The 2012 Sacramento State Hornets football team represented California State University, Sacramento as a member of the Big Sky Conference during the 2012 NCAA Division I FCS football season. Led by sixth-year head coach Marshall Sperbeck, Sacramento State compiled an overall record of 6–5 with a mark of 4–4 in conference play, placing in a three-way tie for fifth in the Big Sky. The Hornets played home games at Hornet Stadium in Sacramento, California.

Schedule

Despite Northern Colorado also being a member of the Big Sky Conference, the September 15 game against Sacramento State was considered a non-conference game.

Game summaries

@ New Mexico State

@ Colorado

Northern Colorado

North Dakota

@ Idaho State

@ Southern Utah

Weber State

@ Eastern Washington

Cal Poly

Montana State

@ UC Davis

References

Sacramento State
Sacramento State Hornets football seasons
Sacramento State Hornets football